Kannawurf is a village and a former municipality in the Sömmerda district of Thuringia, Germany. Since 1 January 2019, it is part of the municipality Kindelbrück.

Sömmerda (district)
Former municipalities in Thuringia